Ernesto J. Baron (August 15, 1940 – January 23, 2006), professionally known as Ka Ernie Baron, was a Filipino broadcaster and inventor. He spent more than 40 years in the field of broadcasting. He was best known as the weather presenter in the ABS-CBN news program TV Patrol. He was also known as The Walking Encyclopedia.

Career
Considered one of the pioneers of Radyo Patrol, which counts as contemporaries, among others, Rey Langit, Noli de Castro, Joe Taruc, Mario Garcia, Bobby Guanzon, Orly Mercado and Bong Lapira, Baron, Ka Ernie to his legions of followers, started his radio career with the general information program, Gintong Kaalaman, on the old DZAQ, the forerunner of what is now DZMM Radyo Patrol 630. During the Martial Law era, he also worked as one of the news anchors of the station DZSA 1230 kHz (now DWXI 1314 AM).

When ABS-CBN returned on the air after the Marcos regime, he hosted the radio program Knowledge Power as well as its spin-off show on television of the same title. He also advocated the use of herbal medicine called pito pito and cleansing diet in his programs and media appearances, which irked medical professionals and then dismissed him as promoter of quack medicine.

Baron made his first and only movie appearance on Pera o Bayong (based on the game segment from Magandang Tanghali Bayan).

Baron was also a proponent of scientific and technological advances in the Philippines. To attest to this, he was the inventor of the so-called DC Super Antenna which became Baron Super Antenna, a sophisticated yet reasonably-priced outdoor TV antenna.

Personal life
Baron was married to Josephine Baron and had one daughter named Shirley. The Barons are adherents of Iglesia ni Cristo.

Death
He died of heart attack on the morning of January 23, 2006, in Muntinlupa City Medical Center, Muntinlupa, at the age of 65.

Several months after his death, he was replaced by Kim Atienza as weather presenter of TV Patrol World, and the program's weather segment had been renamed as "Weather Weather Lang".

Awards

References

External links
Charlatan to some, but idol to many
Ernie Baron Passes Away at 65
ABS-CBN News - Ernie Baron 'always a kapamilya'

1940 births
2006 deaths
People from Dagupan
Filipino television journalists
Filipino radio journalists
Filipino inventors
Filipino television meteorologists
Members of Iglesia ni Cristo
ABS-CBN personalities
ABS-CBN News and Current Affairs people
20th-century inventors
Weather presenters